The states called Syro-Hittite, Neo-Hittite (in older literature), or Luwian-Aramean (in modern scholarly works), were Luwian and Aramean regional polities of the Iron Age, situated in southeastern parts of modern Turkey and northwestern parts of modern Syria, known in ancient times as lands of Hatti and Aram. They arose following the collapse of the Hittite New Kingdom in the 12th century BCE, and lasted until they were subdued by the Assyrian Empire in the 8th century BCE. They are grouped together by scholars, on the basis of several cultural criteria, that are recognized as similar and mutually shared between both societies, northern (Luwian) and southern (Aramean). Cultural exchange between those societies is seen as a specific regional phenomenon, particularly in light of significant linguistic distinctions between the two main regional languages, with Luwian belonging to the Anatolian group of Indo-European languages, and Aramaic belonging to the Northwest Semitic group of Semitic languages. Several questions related to regional grouping of Luwian and Aramaean states are viewed differently among scholars, including some views that are critical towards such grouping in general.

Name

One of the most contested issues within the field is related to the choice of proper terms for this group of states. On that issue, scholars are divided into several categories. Some prefer terms that are derived from endonymic (native) names for Luwians and Arameans, thus using terms like Luwian-Aramean or Aramean-Luwian. Others prefer to use terms that are derived from various exonymic (foreign) names, thus proposing designations like Syrian-Anatolian or Syro-Anatolian, based on Greek term Anatolia, combined with anachronistic application of Syrian labels, in the sense that was introduced much later, by ancient Greeks, as their designation for Arameans and their land (Aram). Such preference for foreign terms, advocated by some western scholars, is viewed as being culturally biased, and thus insensitive towards native (endonymic) terminology. Some scholars still use older terms, like Syro-Hittite and Neo-Hittite, but those terms have several additional meanings in scholarly literature. More precise term Post-Hittite is also used, as a broad designation for the entire period of Anatolian history spanning from the 12th to the 6th century BCE.

Anachronistic uses of Syrian labels in modern scholarly literature were additionally challenged after the recent discovery of the bilingual Çineköy inscription from the 8th century BCE, written in Luwian and Phoenician languages. The inscription contained references to the neighbouring Assyria, inscribed in a specific form that renders as Syria, thus providing additional (and in the same time the oldest) evidence for the dominant scholarly view on the origins and primary meanings of the term Syria, that originated as an apheretic form of the term Assyria, and was redefined much later, by ancient Greeks, who introduced a territorial distinction between two names, and started to use term Syria as a specific designation for western regions (ancient Aram). For ancient Luwians, Syria was designation for Assyria proper, thus revealing the later Greek use of the term Syria as very different from its original meaning, and also anachronistic if used in modern scientific descriptions of historical realities, related to Luwian and Aramean states of the Iron Age.

Late Bronze Age-Early Iron Age transition

The collapse of the Hittite New Kingdom is usually associated with the gradual decline of Eastern Mediterranean trade networks and the resulting collapse of major Late Bronze Age cities in the Levant, Anatolia and the Aegean. At the beginning of the 12th century BC, Wilusa (Troy) was destroyed and the Hittite New Kingdom suffered a sudden devastating attack from the Kaskas, who occupied the coasts around the Black Sea, and who joined with the Mysians. They proceeded to destroy almost all Hittite sites but were finally defeated by the Assyrians beyond the southern borders near the Tigris. Hatti, Arzawa (Lydia), Alashiya (Cyprus), Ugarit and Alalakh were destroyed.

Hattusa, the Hittite capital, was completely destroyed. Following this collapse of large cities and the Hittite state, the Early Iron Age in northern Mesopotamia saw a dispersal of settlements and ruralization, with the appearance of large numbers of hamlets, villages, and farmsteads. Syro-Hittite states emerged in the process of such major landscape transformation, in the form of regional states with new political structures and cultural affiliations. David Hawkins was able to trace a dynastic link between the Hittite imperial dynasty and the "Great Kings" and "Country-lords" of Melid and Karkamish of the Early Iron Age, proving an uninterrupted continuity between the Late Bronze Age and the Early Iron Age at those sites.

Aside from literary evidence from inscriptions, the uninterrupted cultural continuity of Post-Hittite states in the region, during the transitional period between the Late Bronze Age and the Early Iron Age, is now further confirmed by recent archaeological work at the Temple of the Storm God on the citadel of Aleppo, and Ain Dara temple, where the Late Bronze Age temple buildings continue into the Iron Age without hiatus, with repeated periods of construction in the Early Iron Age.

List of Syro-Hittite states

The Syro–Hittite states may be divided into two groups: a northern group where Hittite rulers remained in power, and a southern group where Aramaeans came to rule from about 1000 BC. These states were highly decentralised structures; some appear to have been only loose confederations of sub-kingdoms.

The northern group includes:
 Tabal. It may have included a group of city states called the Tyanitis (Tuwana, Tunna, Shinukhtu, Ishtunda)
 Kammanu (with Melid)
 Hilakku
 Quwê (with a stronghold at modern Karatepe)
 Gurgum
 Kummuh
 Carchemish

The southern group includes:
 Palistin (whose capital was probably Tell Tayinat)
 Bit Gabbari (with Sam'al)
 Bit-Adini (with the city of Til Barsip)
 Bit Bahiani (with Guzana)
 Pattin (also Pattina or Unqi) (with the city of Kinalua, maybe modern Tell Tayinat)
 Ain Dara, a religious center
 Bit Agusi (with the cities of Arpad, Nampigi, and (later on) Aleppo)
 Hatarikka-Luhuti (the capital city of which was at Hatarikka)
 Hamath

Inscriptions
Luwian monumental inscriptions in Anatolian hieroglyphs continue almost uninterrupted from the 13th-century Hittite imperial monuments to the Early Iron Age Syro-Hittite inscriptions of Karkemish, Melid, Aleppo and elsewhere. Luwian hieroglyphs were chosen by many of the Syro-Hittite regional kingdoms for their monumental inscriptions, which often appear in bi- or tri-lingual inscriptions with Aramaic, Phoenician or Akkadian versions. The Early Iron Age in Northern Mesopotamia also saw a gradual spread of alphabetic writing in Aramaic and Phoenician. During the cultural interactions on the Levantine coast of Syro-Palestine and North Syria in the tenth through 8th centuries BC, Greeks and Phrygians adopted the alphabetic writing from the Phoenicians.

See also

References

Sources

External links
Neo-Hittite Monuments

 
States and territories established in the 12th century BC
States and territories disestablished in the 7th century BC
Ancient Syria
Ancient Near East
Iron Age Anatolia
Late Bronze Age collapse
Aramean states